170 Street is a major arterial road in west Edmonton, Alberta. It serves residential, commercial and industrial areas.
Gervais Road / Hebert Road is a major arterial road in south St. Albert, Alberta, Canada. It serves residential and commercial areas.

The portion of 170 Street between Whitemud Drive and Yellowhead Trail is part of Edmonton's Inner Ring Road. As such, it is a major artery used for moving people and goods around the city.

West Edmonton Mall is located on the west side of 170 Street between 87 Avenue and 90 Avenue. The Misericordia Community Hospital is located on the east side of 170 Street between 87 Avenue and 90 Avenue. A pedestrian footbridge formerly connected the hospital grounds to the mall; a new footbridge is under construction, scheduled to be completed in 2022.

Prior to Anthony Henday Drive being extended to Yellowhead Trail, 170 Street between Whitemud Drive and Yellowhead Trail was designated as part of Highway 2.  In addition, prior to Highway 16X being renumbered to Highway 16, 170 Street between Stony Plain Road and Yellowhead Trail was designated as part of Highway 16.

Neighbourhoods
List of neighbourhoods 170 Street runs through, in order from south to north:

Edmonton 
 Gariepy
 Oleskiw
 Callingwood South
 Westridge
 Callingwood North
 Elmwood
 Thorncliff
 West Meadowlark Park
 Summerlea
 Glenwood
 Terra Losa
 Place LaRue
 Stone Industrial
 Youngstown Industrial
 McNamara Industrial
 West Sheffield Industrial
 Armstrong Industrial
 Norwester Industrial
 Carleton Square Industrial
 Kinodemau Plains Area
 Mistatim Industrial

St. Albert 
 Heritage Lakes
 Grandin Park
 Sturgeon Heights
 Akinsdale
 Forest Lawn

Major intersections

See also 

 List of streets in Edmonton
 Transportation in Edmonton

References

Roads in Edmonton
Roads in St. Albert, Alberta
Former segments of the Trans-Canada Highway